Cursty Jackson (born 11 September 1990) is a former American female volleyball player and current college volleyball coach. She is currently an assistant coach of the Long Beach State women's volleyball team.

Career 
She was member of the United States national team that won the 2015 Pan American Games gold medal, the 2013 FIVB Volleyball World Grand Prix, and the 2013 FIVB Women's World Grand Champions Cup.

On the college level, she played for University of Nevada, Las Vegas.

On the club level she played for Galatasaray in 2013.

Personal life 
She is married to French volleyball player Kévin Le Roux.

References

External links 
 
 

Living people
1990 births
American women's volleyball players
African-American volleyball players
Middle blockers
UNLV Rebels women's volleyball players
American expatriate sportspeople in Turkey
Expatriate volleyball players in Turkey
Pan American Games gold medalists for the United States
Pan American Games medalists in volleyball
Volleyball players at the 2015 Pan American Games
Galatasaray S.K. (women's volleyball) players
Medalists at the 2015 Pan American Games
21st-century African-American sportspeople
21st-century African-American women
20th-century American women
21st-century American women